András Ágoston (born 1944) is a Serbian retired politician. An ethnic Hungarian, he led the Democratic Party of Vojvodina Hungarians from its foundation in 1997 to 2012.

He was one of the leaders of the coalition "Hungarian Union" on 2007 Serbian parliamentary election together with Sándor Páll that won no seats. He was then a member of the "Hungarian Coalition" together with István Pásztors Alliance of Vojvodina Hungarians and Sándor Pálls Democratic Fellowship of Vojvodina Hungarians, created for the purpose of the 2008 Serbian parliamentary election.

References

Living people
1944 births
People from Ada, Serbia
Democratic Party of Vojvodina Hungarians politicians